Mark Sears (born February 19, 2002) is an American college basketball player for the Alabama Crimson Tide of the Southeastern Conference (SEC). He previously played for the Ohio Bobcats.

High school career
Sears began his high school career at Muscle Shoals High School in Muscle Shoals, Alabama. In February 2019, he recorded 31 points, 12 rebounds and five assists in a 64–52 win over Bessemer City High School in the Class 6A Northwest Regional championship. As a junior, he led the team to the Class 6A state semifinal. In August 2019, it was announced that Sears was no longer enrolled at the school. He subsequently transferred to Hargrave Military Academy. As a senior, Sears averaged 14 points, three assists and five rebounds per game and helped lead Hargrave to the Final 4 of the Prep National Championship with a 37–4 overall record. He committed to playing college basketball for Ohio.

College career

Ohio
Sears came off the bench as a freshman, and began to see more minutes after Jason Preston was sidelined with a leg injury. Sears averaged 8.5 points, 2.8 rebounds and 3.4 assists per game, earning MAC All-Freshman Team honors. After Preston declared for the 2021 NBA draft following the season, Sears was named the team's starting point guard going into his sophomore season. In the offseason, he worked on improving his shooting by attempting 15,000 three-point shots. On December 21, 2021, Sears scored 33 points in an 85–70 win over USC Upstate. He scored a career-high 37 points on March 21, 2022, in a 91–86 loss to Abilene Christian in the College Basketball Invitational. Sears was named to the First Team All-MAC after the 2021–22 season. As a sophomore, he averaged 19.7 points, six rebounds and 4.1 assists per game. On March 30, 2022, Sears entered the transfer portal.

Alabama
On April 8, 2022, Sears announced that he had committed to Alabama.

Career statistics

College

|-
| style="text-align:left;"| 2020–21
| style="text-align:left;"| Ohio
| 24 || 5 || 19.5 || .467 || .279 || .851 || 2.8 || 3.4 || 1.0 || .0 || 8.5
|-
| style="text-align:left;"| 2021–22
| style="text-align:left;"| Ohio
| 35 || 35 || 35.7 || .443 || .408 || .885 || 6.0 || 4.1 || 1.7 || .1 || 19.7
|- class="sortbottom"
| style="text-align:center;" colspan="2"| Career
| 59 || 40 || 29.1 || .448 || .379 || .876 || 4.7 || 3.8 || 1.4 || .1 || 15.1

References

External links
Ohio Bobcats bio
Hargrave Military Academy Tigers bio

2002 births
Living people
American men's basketball players
Basketball players from Alabama
People from Muscle Shoals, Alabama
Point guards
Ohio Bobcats men's basketball players